Tadei Pivk (born 20 July 1981) is an Italian male sky runner, who won two Skyrunning World Cup in the SkyRace (2015, 2016).

Biography
He won 2015 Skyrunner World Series and 2016 Skyrunner World Series in SkyRace category.

Selected results

National titles
Italian Long Distance Mountain Running Championships
Long distance mountain running: 2013
Italian Skyrunning Championships 
Overall: 2010
SkyRace: 2013, 2014
SkyMarathon: 2012, 2015, 2016

References

External links
 Tadei Pivk profile at Nortec

1981 births
Living people
Italian sky runners
Italian male mountain runners
21st-century Italian people